Jason Winston George (born February 9, 1972) is an American actor and model. He is best known for his roles as Michael Bourne on the NBC daytime soap opera Sunset Beach, as J.T. Hunter on the UPN television sitcom Eve, as Dr. Otis Cole on ABC's Off the Map, and as Dr. Ben Warren on Grey's Anatomy and its spinoff Station 19.

Life and career
George was born in Virginia Beach, Virginia. He graduated from the University of Virginia in 1994 with a double major in Rhetoric and Communication Studies and Drama. He met his wife Vandana Khanna, an Indian-American poet, while studying at the University of Virginia. They were married on July 10, 1999, and have three children.

In 1996, George was cast as lifeguard Michael Bourne on the soap opera Sunset Beach, a role he played from the series' first episode on January 6, 1997, until the show ended on December 31, 1999.

In 2000, he made a successful stage appearance in Rita Dove's drama The Darker Face of the Earth at the Fountain Theatre in Los Angeles, where he played the male lead of Augustus.

From 2001 to 2002 he played the rapper Status Quo in Off Centre. In 2002, George had a role in Clockstoppers, a film directed by Jonathan Frakes. He has also appeared on many ABC series, such as What About Brian, Eli Stone, Eastwick, Off the Map, Grey's Anatomy, and guest starred on Castle and Desperate Housewives. He also was cast as a regular on the ABC series Mistresses. He currently stars on Grey's Anatomy and Station 19 as Ben Warren, a doctor and a firefighter at Seattle Fire Station 19.

Filmography

Film

Television

Awards and nominations

References

External links
 

1972 births
Living people
American male television actors
People from Virginia Beach, Virginia
University of Virginia alumni
African-American male actors
American male soap opera actors
Male models from Virginia
21st-century African-American people
20th-century African-American people